Wael Gharzeddine (born 3 February 1978) is a Lebanese football coach who is the head coach of Jordanian women's club Etihad.

Career 
Beginning his coaching career in Australia, Gharzeddine moved to Brazil where he coached the youth teams of Atletico Mineiro and Fluminense. He then moved to Spain, coaching UE Cornellà's U14 team, before moving to Lebanon, where he coached SAS in the Lebanese Women's Football League between 2014 and 2016, winning two league titles and a cup.

In 2017, Gharzeddine became the head coach of the Lebanon women's national team. He finished in third place in the 2019 WAFF Women's Championship. Under his management, the national team made the biggest jump in points in the FIFA ranking of December 2021, mainly due to ranking best second in the 2022 AFC Women's Asian Cup Qualifiers. In February 2022, he resigned as head coach of the Lebanon women's national team.

Gharzeddine also coached the Lebanon women's national under-19 team between 2018 and 2019, finishing as runner-up in the 2018 WAFF U-18 Women's Championship. That national team made a 22-place jump in the AFC ranking to reach the 12th place in Asia. 

On 22 February 2022, Gharzeddine was appointed head coach of Jordan Women's Football League side Etihad, section of the 6 Yard football academy. In his first year with the club, he led the team to second-place finishes in the league and the cup in the club's debut season.

Personal life
Born in Ras el-Matn, Lebanon, Gharzeddine holds both Lebanese and Australian citizenship.

Managerial statistics

Honours 
Atlético Mineiro
 Taça Belo Horizonte de Juniores: 2009

Australian Football Skool
 Institute Cup U-19: 2010

SAS
 Lebanese Women's Football League: 2014–15, 2015–16
 Lebanese Women's FA Cup: 2013–14, 2014–15

Lebanon U19
 WAFF U-18 Girls Championship runner-up: 2018

Lebanon
 WAFF Women's Championship third place: 2019

References

External links
 

1978 births
Living people
People from Baabda District
Lebanese emigrants to Australia
Sportspeople of Lebanese descent
Naturalised citizens of Australia
Lebanese football managers
Australian soccer coaches
Association football coaches
South Melbourne FC managers
Clube Atlético Mineiro managers
UE Cornellà managers
Stars Association for Sports managers
Lebanon women's national football team managers
Lebanese Women's Football League managers
Jordan Women's Football League managers
Lebanese expatriate football managers
Lebanese expatriate sportspeople in Brazil
Lebanese expatriate sportspeople in Spain
Lebanese expatriate sportspeople in Jordan
Australian expatriate soccer coaches
Australian expatriate sportspeople in Brazil
Australian expatriate sportspeople in Spain
Australian expatriate sportspeople in Jordan
Expatriate football managers in Spain
Expatriate football managers in Brazil
Expatriate football managers in Jordan